Spanky Manikan (March 22, 1942 – January 14, 2018) was a Filipino theater, film and television actor.

In 1981, Manikan won as the Metro Manila Film Festival Best Supporting Actor and the Catholic Mass Media Awards Best Supporting Actor for Himala. He was also awarded the Best Supporting Actor for GMA's Bahaghari Awards for the tele-movie Parola in 1995. In 2014, Manikan was nominated by the PMPC Star Awards as Best Supporting Actor for Bamboo Flowers. On December 1, 2014, he was awarded the Best Actor (Non-Musical) by the Aliw Awards for his portrayal of Zacarias Monzon in Tanghalang Pilipino's Mga Ama Mga Anak .

Career
He began his theater career with the Philippine Educational Theater Association (PETA) in the production Halimaw in 1972. Since then, he has acted with Dulaang UP, Manila Metropolitan Theater, Bulwagang Gantimpala and Tanghalang Pilipino of the Cultural Center of the Philippines (CCP). He also played roles in Kabesang Tales, Joe Hill, The Caucasian Chalk Circle, Rehas Sa Tubig, Solo Entre Las Sombras, General Goyo, The Boor, Henry IV (Pirandello), Mando Plaridel, Canuplin, Marat Sade, Kang Tse, Bombita, Pilipinas Circa 1900, Bien Aligtad, Puntila and Matti, Pantaglieze, The Iceman Cometh, Maliw and Mga Ama Mga Anak.

Manikan's filmography consists of local and international productions, with roles in Lino Brocka's Maynila sa Kuko Ng Liwanag and Bona, and Ishmael Bernal's Broken Marriage and Himala. He went on to work with American and European directors in Behind Enemy Lines, Saigon Commandos, HBO's A Dangerous Life, Le Zhan Chang An, In Naam der Koningin, Tatort-Manila, Au Bout De Rouleau, and Amigo.

Health and death 
In August 2017, Manikan was diagnosed with stage-4 lung cancer.

On January 14, 2018, Manikan died due to lung cancer, at the age of 75.

Theater roles

(2014) Mga Ama Mga Anak, Zacarias Monzon, Tanghalang Pilipino, Cultural Center of the Philippines (CCP)
(2013) Maliw, Tanghalang Pilipino, Cultural Center of the Philippines (CCP)
(2000) The Iceman Cometh; University of the Philippines Repertory (UP)
(1998) Pantaglieze, Judge, Cultural Center of the Philippines (CCP)
(1995) Taos, Cult Leader (1987); Puntila and Matti (Brecht), Matti (Lead), Cultural Center of the Philippines (CCP); The Police, Chief of Police, Cultural Center of the Philippines (CCP) 
(1986) Luwalhati sa Kaitaasan, Fanatic (Lead), Cultural Center of the Philippines (CCP)
(1985) Bien Aligtad, Takyong Bagting, Cultural Center of the Philippines (CCP); Three Penny Opera, MacKieth (Lead), Cultural Center of the Philippines (CCP) 
(1982) The Importance of Being Earnest, Ernest Worthing, Cultural Center of the Philippines (CCP); Pilipinas Circa 1900, Andres (Lead), Philippine Educational Theater Association (PETA) 
(1981) The Weavers, Jaeger, Cultural Center of the Philippines (CCP); Bombita, Nestor, Cultural Center of the Philippines (CCP); Kang Tse, Kang Tse, Cultural Center of the Philippines (CCP) 
(1980) Marat Sade, Jean Paul Marat, UP Theater; Canuplin, Blas, Philippine Educational Theater Association (PETA); Mando Plaridel, Mando Plaridel, Cultural Center of the Philippines (CCP); Henry IV (Pirandello), Henry IV, UP Theater; The Boor, Smirnoff , Cultural Center of the Philippines (CCP); Bent, UP
(1979) Salubong, Cultural Center of the Philippines (CCP); General Goyo, General Goyo, Cultural Center of the Philippines (CCP); Solo Entre Las Sombras, Metropolitan Theater; Rehas Sa Tubig, MET 
(1978) Caucasian Chalk Circle, Narrator, Philippine Educational Theater Association (PETA); Joe Hill, Joe Hill, Philippine Educational Theater Association (PETA); Juan Tamban, Philippine Educational Theater Association (PETA) 
(1975) Kabesang Tales, Philippine Educational Theater Association (PETA); Antigone, Creon, Philippine Educational Theater Association (PETA); Alitan Sa Venetia, Bepe, Philippine Educational Theater Association (PETA)
(1972) Halimaw, Activist, Philippine Educational Theater Association (PETA); Godspell, Clown, Philippine Educational Theater Association (PETA)

Filmography
1975 - Manila in the Claws of Light
1980 - Bona
1982 - Himala
1983 - Broken Marriage
1986 - Behind Enemy Lines
1986 - Saigon Commandos
1988 - A Dangerous Life
1989 - An le Zhan Chang
1991 - B-Team
1992 - Divide by Two
1995 - In Naam der Koningin
1997 - Behind Enemy Lines
1998 - Tatort-Manila
1999 - Bullet
2000 - Buhay Kamao
2001 - Mananabas
2001 - Death Row
2002 - Au bout de Rouleau
2008 - Ploning
2010 - Amigo
2011 - Forever and a Day
2012 - The Strangers
2013 - Alfredo S. Lim (The Untold Story)
2013 - Bamboo Flowers
2014 - Alienasyon
2017 - Ang Panday

Television

Awards

References

External links
 

1942 births
2018 deaths
Filipino male stage actors
Filipino male television actors
Deaths from lung cancer in the Philippines
Filipino male film actors
Male actors from Manila
ABS-CBN personalities
GMA Network personalities
TV5 (Philippine TV network) personalities